The Pedi  or   (also known as the Marota or ) – are a southern African ethnic group that speak Pedi or Sepedi, a dialect belonging to the Northern Sotho enthnolinguistic group. Sepedi is spoken in Sekhukhuneland (Ga-Sekhukhune) and By 1800 Thulare was the leader of the Pedi Empire in the northeastern Transvaal . His capital Manganeng lay on the Tubatse / Steelpoort River

There is confusion regarding the distinction between BaPedi people, and tribes referred to Northern Sotho (Basotho ba Lebowa). On the one hand, one military explanation is that the BaPedi people became powerful at one point under a powerful king that ruled over a large piece of land. During this period, a powerful army of the BaPedi conquered smaller tribes, and proclaimed paramountcy over them. On the other hand, another explanation is that after the decline of one of the BaPedi Kingdom, some tribes separated from the kingship, hence the use of the term Northern Sotho. One reason for separation might be related to the power battle that has been raging for many years between the varying factions in the BaPedi Kingdom. In the year 2020, Judge Ephraim Makgoba made a ruling on the rivalry between members of the BaPedi traditional council.

The separation of powers between Northern Sotho tribes, and the once powerful BaPedi Kingdom became more vivid during the fragmentation of Northern Transvaal. The Lebowa Bantustan wielded political, economic, and social power in the 1980s with the help of the apartheid government. The Lebowa Bantustan was incorporated into South Africa in 1994. Other Northern Sotho tribes can be found in South Africa's northwestern provinces, and speak various other dialects. Examples of tribes with variations of Northern Sotho are found in Seshego, Magoebaskloof, Lebowakgomo, Ga Mamabolo, Ga Mothiba, Ga Dikgale, and Ga Mothapo to mention a few. Some clans in tribes that speak variations of Northern Sotho can be traced back to the Kalanga-Tswana-Sotho group originating from earlier states such as Kingdom of Mapungubwe, Kingdom of Butua, and Great Zimbabwe

The once powerful Pedi tribe said to be of North Eastern African origin that migrated to the South during the great migration period. They are now found almost exclusively in South Africa and Botswana.

Pedi heartland is known as Sekhukhuneland, and is situated between the Olifants and Steelpoort River also known as the Lepelle and the Tubatse.

History 

Proto-Sotho people migrated south from Meroë in Northeast Africa making their way along with modern-day western Zimbabwe through successive waves spanning 5 centuries with the last group of Sotho speakers, the Hurutse, settling in the region west of Gauteng around 16th century. It is from this group that the Pedi/Maroteng originated from the Tswana speaking Kgatla offshoot. In about 1650 they settled in the area to the south of the Steelpoort River where over several generations, linguistic and cultural homogeneity developed to a certain degree. Only in the last half of the 18th century did they broaden their influence over the region, establishing the Pedi paramountcy by bringing smaller neighboring chiefdoms under their control.

During migrations in and around this area, groups of people from diverse origins began to concentrate around dikgoro or ruling nuclear groups. They identified themselves through symbolic allegiances to totemic animals such as tau (lion), kolobe (pig) and kwena (crocodile).

The Marota Empire/ Pedi Kingdom

The Pedi polity under King Thulare (c. 1780–1820) was made up of land that stretched from present-day Rustenburg to the lowveld in the west and as far south as the Vaal river. Pedi power was undermined during the Mfecane, by Ndwandwe invaders from the south-east. A period of dislocation followed, after which the polity was re-stabilized under Thulare's son Sekwati.

Sekwati succeeded Thulare as paramount chief of the Pedi in the northern Transvaal (Limpopo) and was frequently in conflict with the Matabele under Mzilikazi, and plundered by the Zulu and the Swazi. Sekwati has also engaged in numerous negotiations and struggles for control over land and labor with the Afrikaans-speaking farmers (Boers) who had since settled in the region.

These disputes over land occurred after the founding of Ohrigstad in 1845, but after the town was incorporated into the Transvaal Republic in 1857 and the Republic of Lydenburg was formed, an agreement was reached that the Steelpoort River was the border between the Pedi and the Republic.
The Pedi were well equipped to defend themselves though, as Sekwati and his heir, Sekhukhune I were able to procure firearms, mostly through migrant labor to the Kimberley diamond fields and as far as Port Elizabeth. The Pedi paramountcy's power was also cemented by the fact that chiefs of subordinate villages, or kgoro, take their principal wives from the ruling house. This system of cousin marriage resulted in the perpetuation of marriage links between the ruling house and the subordinate groups, and involved the payment of inflated magadi or brideprice mostly in the form of cattle, to the Maroteng house.

Sekhukhune Wars

Sekhukune I succeeded his father in 1861 and repelled an attack against the Swazi. At the time, there were also border disputes with the Transvaal, which lead to the formation of Burgersfort, which was manned by volunteers from Lydenburg. By the 1870s, the Pedi were one of three alternative sources of regional authority, alongside the Swazi and the ZAR (Zuid-Afrikaansche Republiek).

Overtime, tensions increased after Sekhukhune refused to pay taxes to the Transvaal government, and the Transvaal declared war in May 1876. It became known as the Sekhukhune War, the outcome of which was that the Transvaal commando's attack failed. After this, volunteers nevertheless continued to devastate Sekhukhune's land and provoke unrest, to the point where peace terms were met in 1877.

Unrest continued, and this became a justification for the British annexing the Transvaal in April 1877, under Sir Theophilus Shepstone. Following the annexation, the British also declared war on Sekhukhune I under Sir Garnet Wolseley, and defeated him in 1879. Sekhukhune was then imprisoned in Pretoria, but later released after the first South African War, when the Transvaal regained independence.

However, soon after his release Sekhukhune was murdered by his half-brother Mampuru, and because his heir had been killed in the war and his grandson, Sekhukhune II was too young to rule, one of his other half-brothers, Kgoloko assumed power as regent.

Apartheid 
Later, according to apartheid segregation policy, the Pedi would be assigned the homeland of Lebowa.....

Culture

Use of Totems 
Like the other Sotho-Tswana groups, the Bapedi people use totems to identify sister clans and kinship. The most widely used totems are as follows in Sepedi:

Settlements 
In pre-conquest times, people settled on elevated sites in relatively large villages, divided into kgoro (pl. dikgoro, groups centred on agnatic family clusters). Each consisted of a group of households, in huts built around a central area which served as meeting-place, cattle byre, graveyard and ancestral shrine. Households' huts were ranked in order of seniority. Each wife of a polygynous marriage had her own round thatched hut, joined to other huts by a series of open-air enclosures (lapa) encircled by mud walls. Older boys and girls, respectively, would be housed in separate huts. Aspirations to live in a more modern style, along with practicality, have led most families to abandon the round hut style for rectangular, flat-tin-roofed houses. Processes of forced and semi-voluntary relocation, and an apartheid government planning scheme implemented in the name of "betterment", have meant that many newer settlements, and the outskirts of many older ones, consist of houses built in grid-formation, occupied by individual families unrelated to their neighbors.

Arts 

Important crafts included metalsmithing, beadwork, pottery, house-building and painting, woodworking (especially the making of drums).

the arts of the Pedi, they are known for metal forging, beading, pottery, woodworking much more in drum making and also painting.

Mmino wa Setšo 
Pedi music consists of a single six-note scale traditionally played on reeds, but currently it is played more on a jaw harp or autoharp.  Migrants influenced by Kibala music involves playing aluminum pipes of different heights to reproduce vocal harmonies.  Traditional dances, women dance on their knees, usually accompanied by drums, backing vocals and with a lead singer, involve vigorous shaking topless from the upper torso while the women kneel on the floor.

Songs are also part of Pedi culture.  While working the Pedi sang together to finish the job faster, they had A song about killing a Lion to become a man it was a bit peculiar song.  The act of killing a Lion is very unusual and is no longer practiced.  In fact, it was so unusual that if a boy was successful he would get high status and the ultimate prize - marrying the chief's daughter.
The Bapedi, they also have the different types of cultural music:
 Mpepetlwane: played by young girls;
 Mmatšhidi: played by older men and women;
 Kiba / Dinaka: played by men and boys and now joined by women;
 Dipela: played by everyone
 Makgakgasa and also played by older women.

Pedi music (mmino wa setso: traditional music, lit. music of origin) has a six-note scale. The same applies to variants of Mmino wa Setšo as practiced by Basotho ba Leboa (Northern Sotho) tribes in the Capricorn, Blouberg, Waterberg districts, as well as BaVhenda in the Vhembe district. Mmino wa Setšo (indigenous African music) can also be construed as African Musicology -  a concept that is often used to distinguish the study of indigenous African music from the dominant ethnomusicology discipline in academe.  Ethnomusicology has a strong footprint in academe spanning several decades. Such presence is evident in ethnomusicology journals that can be traced back to the 1950s. Ethnomusicologists who study indigenous African music have been criticized for studying the subject from a subjective Western point of view, especially given the dominance of Western musical canon in South Africa. In South Africa, authors such as Mapaya indicate that for many years, African Musicology has been studied from a multi-cultural perspective without music success. Scholars of African Musicology such as Agawu, Mapaya, Nketia and Nzewi emphasize the study of indigenous African music from the perspective, and language of the practitioners (baletši). These scholars argue for the study of African Musicology from an approach that elevates the practitioners, actions, and their interactions.

Categories of Mmino wa Setšo 
Mmino wa Setšo in Limpopo province has a number of categories. Categories of Mmino wa Setšo are distinguished according to the function they serve in the community.

Dinaka/Kiba 
The peak of Pedi (and northern Sotho) musical expression is arguably the kiba genre, which has transcended its rural roots to become a migrant style.  In its men's version, it features an ensemble of players, each playing an aluminum end-blown pipe of a different pitch (naka, pl. dinaka) and together producing a descending melody that mimics traditional vocal songs with richly harmonized qualities. Mapaya provides for a provided for a detailed descriptive analysis of Dinaka/Kiba music and dance, from a Northern Sotho perspective.

Alternative to Dinaka/Kiba 
In the women's version, a development of earlier female genres which has recently been included within the definition of kiba, a group of women sings songs (koša ya dikhuru- loosely translated: knee-dance music). This translation has it roots in the traditional kneeling dance that involves salacious shaking movements of the breasts accompanied by chants. These dances are still very common among Tswana, Sotho and Nguni women. This genre comprises sets of traditional songs steered by a lead singer accompanied by a chorus and an ensemble of drums (meropa), previously wooden but now made of oil-drums and milk-urns.  These are generally sung at drinking parties and/or during celebrations such as weddings.

Mmino wa bana 
Children occupy a special place in the broader category of Mmino wa Setšo. Research shows that mmino wa bana can be examined for its musicological elements, educational validity, and the general social functions

Kinship 
Kgoshi – a loose collection of kinsmen with related males at its core – was as much a jural unit as a kinship one, since membership was defined by acceptance of the kgoro-head's authority rather than primarily by descent.  Royal or chiefly kgoros sometimes underwent rapid subdivision as sons contended for positions of authority.

Marriage was patrilocal. Polygamy was practiced mostly by people of higher, especially chiefly, status.  Marriage was preferred with a close or classificatory cousin, especially a mother's brother's daughter, but this preference was most often realised in the case of ruling or chiefly families. Practiced by the ruling dynasty, during its period of dominance, it represented a system of political integration and control recycling of bridewealth (dikgomo di boela shakeng; returning of bride cattle). Cousin marriage meant that the two sets of prospective in-laws were closely connected even before the event of a marriage, and went along with an ideology of sibling-linkage, through which the Magadi (bridewealth) procured for a daughter's marriage would, in turn, be used to get a bride for her brother, and he would repay his sister by offering a daughter to her son in marriage. Cousin marriage is still practiced, but less frequently. Polygyny too is now rare, many marriages end in divorce or separation, and a large number of young women remain single and raise their children in small (and often very poor) female-headed households. But new forms of domestic co-operation have come into being, often between brothers and sisters, or matrilineally linked relatives.

Previously the oldest son of a household within a polygynous family would inherit the house-property of his mother, including its cattle, and was supposed to act as custodian of these goods for the benefit of the household's other children.  With the decline of cattle-keeping and the sharp increase in land-shortage, this has switched to a system of last-born inheritance, primarily of land.

The life-cycle for both sexes was differentiated by important rituals. Both girls and boys underwent initiation. Boys (bašemane, later mašoboro) spent their youth looking after cattle at remote outposts, in the company of peers and older youths. Circumcision and initiation at koma (initiation school), held about once every five years, socialized youths into groups of cohorts or regiments (mephato) bearing the leader's name, whose members then maintained lifelong loyalty to each other, and often traveled together to find work on the farms or on the mines. Girls attended their own koma and were initiated into their own regiments (ditswa-bothuku), usually two years after the boys. Initiation is still practiced, and provides a considerable income to the chiefs who license it for a fee or, in recent years, to private entrepreneurs who have established initiation schools beyond chiefs' jurisdiction.

Location

The present-day Pedi area, Sekhukhuneland, is situated between the Olifants River (Lepelle) and its tributary the Steelpoort River (Tubatse); bordered on the east by the Drakensberg range, and crossed by the Leolo mountains. But at the height of its power the Pedi polity under Thulare (about 1780–1820) included an area stretching from the site of present-day Rustenburg in the west to the Lowveld in the east, and ranging as far south as the Vaal River. Reliable historians and sources also credit the Pedi kingdom as the first and dominant monarchy established in the region. The kingdom, which boasted numerous victories over the Boers and the British armies, was one of the strongest and largest in Southern Africa in the mid to late 1800s under the warrior king Sekhukhune I, whose kingdom stretched from the Vaal River in the south to the Limpopo River in the north.

The area under Pedi control was severely limited when the polity was defeated by British troops in 1879. Reserves were created for this and for other Northern Sotho groups by the Transvaal Republic's Native Location Commission. Over the next hundred years or so, these reserves were then variously combined and separated by a succession of government planners. By 1972 this planning had culminated in the creation of an allegedly independent national unit or "homeland" named Lebowa. In terms of the government's plans to accommodate ethnic groups separated from each other, this was designed to act as a place of residence for all Northern Sotho speakers. But many Pedi had never resided here: since the polity's defeat, they had become involved in a series of labor-tenancy or sharecropping arrangements with white farmers, lived as tenants on crown land, or purchased farms communally as freeholders, or moved to live in the townships adjoining Pretoria and Johannesburg on a permanent or semi-permanent basis. In total, however, the population of the Lebowa homeland increased rapidly after the mid-1950s, due to the forced relocations from rural areas and cities in common South Africa undertaken by apartheid's planners, and to voluntary relocations by which former labor tenants sought independence from the restrictive and deprived conditions under which they had lived on the white farms.

Subsistence and economy 

The pre-conquest economy combined cattle-keeping with hoe cultivation. Principal crops were sorghum, pumpkins and legumes, which were grown by women on fields allocated to them when they married. Women hoed and weeded; did pottery and built and decorated huts with mud; made sleeping mats and baskets; ground grain, cooked, brewed, and collected water and wood. Men did some work in fields at peak times; hunted and herded; did woodwork, prepared hides, and were metal workers and smiths. Most major tasks were done communally by matsema (work-parties).

The chief was depended upon to perform rain-making for his subjects. The introduction of the animal-drawn plow, and of maize, later transformed the labor division significantly, especially when combined with the effects of labor migration. Men's leaving home to work for wages was initially undertaken by regimental groups of youths to satisfy the paramount's firepower requirements but later became increasingly necessary to individual households as population increase within the reserve and land degradation made it impossible to subsist from cultivation alone. Despite increasingly long absences, male migrants nonetheless remained committed to the maintenance of their fields: plowing had now to be carried out during periods of leave or entrusted to professional plowmen or tractor owners.  Women were left to manage and carry out all other agricultural tasks. Men, although subjected to increased controls in their lives as wage-laborers, fiercely resisted all direct attempts to interfere with the sphere of cattle-keeping and agriculture.  Their resistance erupted in open rebellion – ultimately subdued – during the 1950s.  In later decades, some families have continued to practice cultivation and to keep stock. These activities should more accurately be seen as demonstrating a long-term commitment to the rural social system to gain security in retirement than as providing a viable form of household subsistence.

In the early 1960s, about 48% of the male population was absent as wage-earners at any given time. Between the 1930s and the 1960s, most Pedi men would spend a short period working on nearby white farms followed by a move to employment on the mines or domestic service and later – especially in more recent times – to factories or industry. Female wage employment began more recently and is rarer and more sporadic.  Some women work for short periods on farms, others have begun, since the 1960s, to work in domestic service in the towns of the Witwatersrand. But in recent years there have been rising levels of education and of expectation, combined with a sharp drop in employment rates. Many youths, better-educated than their parents and hoping for jobs as civil servants or teachers, stand little chance of getting employment of any kind.

Land tenure 

The pre-colonial system of communal or tribal tenure, being broadly similar to that practiced throughout the southern African region, was crystallized, but subtly altered, by the colonial administration.  A man was granted land by the chief for each of his wives; unused land was reallocated by the chief, rather than being inherited within families.  Overpopulation resulting from the government's relocation policies resulted in this system being modified – a household's fields, together with its residential plot, are now inherited, ideally by the youngest married son. Christian Pedi communities who owned freehold farms were removed to the reserve without compensation, but since 1994 South Africa many have now reoccupied their land or are preparing to do so, under restitution legislation. The few Pedi who still live as labor tenants on white farms have been promised some security of tenure by land reform legislation.

Religion 

Ancestors are viewed as intermediaries between humans and The Creator or God (Modimo/Mmopi) and are communicated to by calling on them using a process of burning incense, making an offering and speaking to them (go phasa). If necessary, animal sacrifice may be done or beer presented to the shades on both the mother's and father's side. A key figure in the family ritual was the kgadi (who was usually the father's elder sister). The position of ngaka (diviner) was formerly inherited patrilineally but is now commonly inherited by a woman from her paternal grandfather or great-grandfather.  This is often manifested through illness and through violent possession by spirits (malopo) of the body, the only cure for which is to train as a diviner. There has been a proliferation of diviners in recent times, with many said to be motivated mainly by a desire for material gain.

Rulers

Notable Pedi people 

Charlotte Maxeke - Born Charlotte Makgomo Mannya
Kgalema Motlanthe - 3rd President of South Africa
Lesetja Kganyago – Governor of the South African Reserve Bank.
Rupert Bopape - Founder Of Makgonatsohle Band, which founded Mbaqanga music:Notable groups Mahlathini & Mahotella Queens, Dark City Sisters etc.
Edward Lekganyane - the Zion Christian Church (ZCC) leader
Engenas Lekganyane -the founder of Zion Christian Church (ZCC)
Sefako Makgatho - second President of the African National Congress, born in Ga-Mphahlele village
Marks Mankwane - Co-founder of MakgonaTsohle Band along with Rupert Bopape and West Nkosi.
Malegapuru William Makgoba - Doctor
Thabo Makgoba - South African Anglican Archbishop of Cape Town
David Makhura – premier of Gauteng Province
Julius Malema – political leader. Former leader of the ANC Youth League. Commander in Chief of the Economic Freedom Fighters (EFF)
Mampuru II - King of the Pedi (1879 - 1883)
Richard Maponya – South African businessmen and founder and first president of the National African Federated Chamber of Commerce (NAFCOC). Born in Lenyeye, Tzaneen.
Jeff Masemola -.
Cassel Mathale – third premier of Limpopo province
Yvonne Chaka Chaka – Born Yvonne Machaka-Internationally recognized South African singer, songwriter, actress, entrepreneur, humanitarian and teacher.
Lebo Mathosa - Musician
Kenneth Meshoe – politician
Peter Mokaba – former politician. Former leader of the ANC Youth League
Lydia Mokgokoloshi – actress
Sello Moloto – former premier of Limpopo province
Trott Moloto - Former South Africa National Soccer Coach
Mathole Motshekga- Politician
Aaron Motsoaledi – Minister of Health, South Africa and nephew of Elias Motsoaledi
Caroline Motsoaledi - South African political activist and wife of Elias Motsoaledi
Elias Motsoaledi - South African anti-apartheid activist and one of the eight men sentenced to life imprisonment at the Rivonia Trial
Es'kia Mphahlele - writer, educationist, artist, and activist.
Letlapa Mphahlele – former President of the Pan Africanist Congress (PAC).
Gift Ngoepe - the first black South African, and the sixth South African to sign a professional baseball contract when he signed in October 2008
Lilian Ngoyi - anti-apartheid activist.
Maite Nkoana-Mashabane – Minister of Rural Development and Land Reform, South Africa
Ngoako Ramatlhodi – first premier of Limpopo province
Gwen Ramokgopa - Deputy Minister of Health, former MEC of Health in Gauteng Province
Mamphela Ramphele – Former Director at World Bank. Former principal of the University of Cape Town.
Sello Rasethaba – businessman
Thabo Sefolosha – American basketball player. His father Patrick Sefolosha was a musician from South Africa.
King Matsebe Sekhukhune – son of King Sekwati. He fought two wars: first successfully in 1876 against the SAR and their Swazi allies, then unsuccessfully against the British and Swazi in 1879 during the Sekukuni Wars.
Caiphus Semenya – musician
Tokyo Sexwale – Former Premier of Gauteng.
Caster Semenya – athlete, Olympic Games medal winner
Judith Sephuma - Musician
Hilda Tloubatla – Lead Singer of Mahotella Queens.
Africa Tsoai – actor
King Monada - famous artist.
Master KG - famous artist and composer of the popular song Jerusalema
Kgosientsho Ramokgopa- former mayor of City of Tshwane Metropolitan Municipality and Head of the Investment and Infrastructure Office in the Presidency at Infrastructure South Africa
Phuti Mahanyele - CEO of Shanduka Group 
Kamo Mphela - Amapiano artist
 Pabi Cooper - Amapiano artist
 Focalistic - Rapper

See also 
 Tswana people
 Sotho people
 Sotho-Tswana peoples
 Barotseland
 Lozi people

References

Further reading

External links 

The Loreto Mission, Glen Cowie, Sekukuniland
 The Pedi

 
Monarchies of South Africa
Ethnic groups in South Africa